John Dominic Crossan (born 17 February 1934) is an Irish-American New Testament scholar, historian of early Christianity, former Catholic priest who was a prominent member of the Jesus Seminar, and emeritus professor at DePaul University. His research has focused on the historical Jesus, the theology of noncanonical Gospels, and the application of postmodern hermeneutical approaches to the Bible.
His work is controversial, portraying the Second Coming as a late corruption of Jesus' message and saying that Jesus' divinity is metaphorical.
In place of the eschatological message of the Gospels, Crossan emphasizes the historical context of Jesus and of his followers immediately after his death. 
He describes Jesus' ministry as founded on free healing and communal meals, negating the social hierarchies of Jewish culture and the Roman Empire.

Crossan is a major scholar in contemporary historical Jesus research.
In particular, he and Burton Mack advocated for a non-eschatological view of Jesus, a view that contradicts the more common view that Jesus was an apocalyptic preacher.
While contemporary scholars see more value in noncanonical gospels than past scholars did, Crossan goes further and identifies a few noncanonical gospels as earlier than and superior to the canonical ones. The very early dating of these non-canonical sources is not accepted by the majority of biblical scholars.

Life
Crossan was born on 17 February  1934, in Nenagh, County Tipperary, Ireland. Though his father was a banker, Crossan was steeped in rural Irish life, which he experienced through frequent visits to the home of his paternal grandparents. Upon graduation from St Eunan's College, a boarding high school, in 1950, Crossan joined the Servites, a Catholic religious order, and moved to the United States. He was trained at Stonebridge Seminary, Lake Bluff, Illinois, then ordained a priest in 1957. Crossan returned to Ireland, where he earned his Doctor of Divinity degree in 1959 at St Patrick's College, Maynooth, the Irish national seminary. He then completed two more years of study in biblical languages at the Pontifical Biblical Institute in Rome. In 1965, while studying at the Ecole Biblique in Jordanian East Jerusalem, he travelled through several countries in the region, escaping just days before the outbreak of the Six-Day War of 1967.

After a year at St. Mary of the Lake Seminary in Mundelein, Illinois, and a year at Catholic Theological Union in Chicago, Crossan chose to resign his priesthood. In the fall of 1969 he joined the faculty of DePaul University, where he taught undergraduates comparative religion for 26 years until retiring in 1995. With Robert W. Funk, Crossan served as cochair of the Jesus Seminar, a group of academics studying the historical Jesus, for its first decade. Crossan also served as president of the Chicago Society of Biblical Research in 1978–1979, and as president of the Society of Biblical Literature in 2012.

Crossan married Margaret Dagenais, a professor at Loyola University Chicago in the summer of 1969. She died in 1983 due to a heart attack. In 1986, Crossan married Sarah Sexton, a social worker with two grown children. Since his retirement from academia, Crossan has continued to write and lecture.

Views and methodology
Crossan portrays Jesus as a healer and wise man who taught a message of inclusiveness, tolerance, and liberation.  In his view, Jesus' strategy "was the combination of free healing and common eating . . . that negated the hierarchical and patronal normalcies of Jewish religion and Roman power . . . He was neither broker nor mediator but . . . the announcer that neither should exist between humanity and divinity or humanity and itself."

Central to Crossan's methodology is the dating of texts. This is laid out more or less fully in The Historical Jesus in one of the appendices. He dates part of the Coptic Gospel of Thomas to the 50s CE, as well as the first layer of the hypothetical Q Document (in this he is heavily dependent on the work of John Kloppenborg). He also assigns a portion of the Gospel of Peter, which he calls the "Cross Gospel", to a date preceding the synoptic gospels, the reasoning of which is laid out more fully in The Cross that Spoke: The Origin of the Passion Narratives. He believes the "Cross Gospel" was the forerunner to the passion narratives in the canonical gospels. He does not date the synoptics until the mid to late 70s CE, starting with the Gospel of Mark and ending with Luke in the 90s. As for the Gospel of John, he believes part was constructed at the beginning, and another part closer to the middle, of the 2nd century CE. Following Rudolf Bultmann, he believes there is an earlier "Signs Source" for John as well. His dating methods and conclusions are quite controversial, particularly regarding the dating of Thomas and the "Cross Gospel".

In God and Empire: Jesus Against Rome, Then and Now (2007), Crossan assumes that the reader is familiar with key points from his earlier work on the nonviolent revolutionary Jesus, his Kingdom movement, and the surrounding matrix of the Roman imperial theological system of religion, war, victory, peace, but discusses them in the broader context of the escalating violence in world politics and popular culture of today. Within that matrix, he points out, early in the book, that "(t)here was a human being in the first century who was called 'Divine,' 'Son of God,' 'God,' and 'God from God,' whose titles were 'Lord,' 'Redeemer,' 'Liberator,' and 'Saviour of the World.'" "(M)ost Christians probably think that those titles were originally created and uniquely applied to Christ. But before Jesus ever existed, all those terms belonged to Caesar Augustus." Crossan cites their adoption and application by the early Christians to Jesus as denying them to Caesar Augustus. "They were taking the identity of the Roman emperor and giving it to a Jewish peasant. Either that was a peculiar joke and a very low lampoon, or it was what the Romans called majestas and we call high treason."

In Who Killed Jesus (1995), he draws together a wide range of sources to demonstrate that the Jews not only did not crucify Jesus but that they were not consulted by Pontius Pilate. Further, they did not have a meeting on the eve of Passover (meetings were and are forbidden on that day). He then discusses why these tales appear in the Gospels.

In The Power of Parables: How Fiction by Jesus Became Fiction about Jesus, Crossan proposes a new interpretation of the biblical text: according to his thesis, the Gospels should be seen not as an actual biography, but as "megaparables", in the sense that the life of Jesus was shaped by his teachings, therefore creating some "megaparables", neither completely historical nor completely fictitious. At the end of the book, Crossan states "I conclude that Jesus really existed, that we can know the significant sequence of his life...but that he comes to us trailing clouds of fiction, parables by him and about him, particular incidents as miniparables and whole gospels as megaparables." His contemporary and fellow faith-focused academic Ben Witherington III called Crossan's thesis "a category mistake".

Works

Books

Edited by

Journal articles

References

External links

1934 births
Living people
20th-century biblical scholars
Alumni of St Patrick's College, Maynooth
American biblical scholars
American Christian writers
Christian radicals
Critics of the Christ myth theory
DePaul University faculty
Irish biblical scholars
Irish Christians
Irish emigrants to the United States
Members of the Jesus Seminar
New Testament scholars
People educated at St Eunan's College
People from Nenagh
Pontifical Biblical Institute alumni
Religious naturalists
Former members of Catholic religious institutes